Shahri Buzurg also spelled as Shahr-e Bozorg is one of the 28 districts of Badakhshan province in eastern Afghanistan. The capital is the city of Shahr-e Bozorg. Its northwestern border is along the international border between Afghanistan and Tajikistan while its southwestern border is with Takhar province. Located on the western edge of the province, Shahri Buzurg hosts a population of approximately 42,000 residents.

The name Shahri Buzurg is Dari and translates to Great City.

The district suffered the effects of an earthquake in 2005.

References

External links
Map at the Afghanistan Information Management Services

Districts of Badakhshan Province